Violeta de Outono – Ao Vivo no Theatro Municipal, São Paulo, 03.05.2009 is a live video by Brazilian psychedelic rock band Violeta de Outono, released by Voiceprint Records on July 25, 2011. As the name implies, it was recorded during a show at the Theatro Municipal in São Paulo on May 3, 2009, in which they performed their 1987 debut album in its entirety, as well as some other tracks.

This was one of the last performances of drummer Cláudio Souza in the band.

Tracks

"Introdução"
"Outono"
"Trópico"
"Reflexos da Noite"
"Declínio de Maio"
"Faces"
"Luz"
"Retorno"
"Dia Eterno"
"Noturno Deserto"
"Sombras Flutuantes"
"Tomorrow Never Knows"
"Em Toda Parte"
"Vênus"

Personnel
 Fabio Golfetti – vocals, guitar
 Cláudio Souza – drums
 Gabriel Costa – bass
 Fernando Cardoso – keyboards

References

2011 video albums
Live video albums
2011 live albums
Voiceprint Records albums
Violeta de Outono albums
Portuguese-language live albums